Sadulla Nagar is a village in Uttar Pradesh, India.Utraula, Balrampur, Faizabad, Tulsipur are the nearby Cities to Sadulla Nagar. Pin code is 271307.

Demographics 
As of 2011 Indian Census, Sadulla Nagar Panchayat had a total population of 5,192, of which 2,643 were males and 2,549 were females. The female sex ratio was of 799. Population within the age group of 0 to 6 years was 395. It is located 45 km towards South from District headquarters Balrampur. 167 km from State capital Lucknow

References 

Villages in Faizabad district